School of Physics and Astronomy may refer to:

School of Physics and Astronomy, University of Edinburgh
Department of Physics and Astronomy, University of Manchester, formerly University of Manchester School of Physics and Astronomy
Cardiff School of Physics and Astronomy
Bonn-Cologne Graduate School of Physics and Astronomy